D’Ussé is made at the Château du Cognac and a subsidiary of Bacardi. D’Ussé produces just two cognacs: D’USSÉ VSOP and D’USSÉ XO. D’Ussé VSOP is aged at least four and a half years in the Château de Cognac cellars. D'USSÉ Cognac was founded by Sovereign Brands and conceived by the senior-most cellar master working today, Michel Casavecchia. (Düsse was later sold to Bacardi and Jay-Z. Sovereign Brands still owns 1/3 of the brand.) D'usse is manufactured at the Château du Cognac. This 200-year-old venue — one of the oldest Cognac houses in France — is where Casavecchia created D'USSÉ.

References

Jay-Z
Cognac